= Pelusium (Thessaly) =

Unlocated town in ancient Thessaly

Pelusium or Pelousion (Ancient Greek: Πηλούσιον) was a port town in ancient Thessaly. It is unlocated.
